Qaemiyeh (also Romanized as Qā’emīyeh and Qa‘emīyeh) is a village in Feyziyeh Rural District, in the Central District of Babol County, Mazandaran Province, Iran. At the 2006 census, its population was 507, in 135 families.

References 

Populated places in Babol County